Cichlidogyrus is a genus of monopisthocotylean monogeneans in the family Ancyrocephalidae. The type-species of the genus is Cichlidogyrus arthracanthus Paperna, 1960, by original designation. All the species of the genus are parasites on the gills of fish, namely African Cichlidae, Nandidae and Cyprinodontidae.

Species of Cichlidogyrus are parasitic in many cichlid species in the Lake Tanganyika; a recent study (2016) has shown that species which are parasite on deep-water fish show reduced parasite-host specificity in comparison to species from littoral waters, probably an adaptation to low host availability.

According to Antoine Pariselle and Louis Euzet, 71 species of Cichlidogyrus were known in 2009  - new species have been described since. Nikol Kmentová, Milan Gelnar, Stephan Koblmüller and Maarten P.M. Vanhove estimated that the number of species was more than 100 in 2016 and Chahrazed Rahmouni,
Maarten P. M. Vanhove and Andrea Šimková listed 111 species in 2017.

Species of Cichlidogyrus have been introduced in various parts of the world, as alien species, where their hosts, particularly tilapia, have been introduced.

Species
Among many species, a few examples:
 Cichlidogyrus antoineparisellei Rahmouni, Vanhove & Šimková, 2018 
Cichlidogyrus attenboroughi Kmentová, Gelnar, Koblmüller & Vanhove, 2016 
Cichlidogyrus berminensis Pariselle, Nyom & Bilong, 2013
Cichlidogyrus centesimus Vanhove, Volckaert & Pariselle, 2011
 Cichlidogyrus dracolemma Řehulková, Mendlová & Šimková, 2013 
 Cichlidogyrus evikae Rahmouni, Vanhove & Šimková, 2017 
Cichlidogyrus gillesi Pariselle, Nyom & Bilong, 2013
 Cichlidogyrus jeanloujustinei Rahmouni, Vanhove & Šimková, 2017 
 Cichlidogyrus kmentovae Jorissen, Pariselle & Vanhove in Jorissen et al., 2018 
Cichlidogyrus makasai Vanhove, Volckaert & Pariselle, 2011
 Cichlidogyrus nageus Řehulková, Mendlová & Šimková, 2013 
Cichlidogyrus philander Douëllou, 1993
 Cichlidogyrus sclerosus Paperna & Thurston, 1969
Cichlidogyrus sturmbaueri Vanhove, Volckaert & Pariselle, 2011
 Cichlidogyrus tilapiae Paperna, 1960
Cichlidogyrus vandekerkhovei Vanhove, Volckaert & Pariselle, 2011

References

Ancyrocephalidae
Monogenea genera